Patrick J. McGrath, OC, FRSC FCAHS is a Canadian psychologist. He is emeritus professor of Psychiatry at Dalhousie University in Halifax, Nova Scotia and at the IWK Health Centre where he is a member of the Centre for Pediatric Pain Research and is the director of the Centre for Family Health Research.  He has published extensively in the area of pediatric pain. He also has extensive research on delivery of psychological care at a distance. His clinical practice is at the Centre for Medical and Psychological Health in Ottawa, Canada.

In 2018, the Journal of Pediatric Psychology published a solicited autobiographical article detailing his academic history . He was on the Governing Council of the Canadian Institutes of Health Research for 7 years (2004-2011) and was Integrated Vice President Research, Innovation and Knowledge Translation at the IWK Health Centre and the Nova Scotia Health Authority for a decade until September 2017. He is a founder and chairman of the board of the Strongest Families Institute which delivers mental health care to families who have children with mental health problems.

Honours and awards
1972-73: R.S. McLaughlin Fellowship, Queen's University at Kingston
1973-74: Canada Council, Doctoral Fellowship
1982-89: Career Scientist Award, Ontario Ministry of Health
1988	: Fellow, Canadian Psychological Association
1988	: Book of the Year Award, awarded by the American Journal of Nursing for Pain in Children and Adolescents.
1993-98: Bristol-Myers Squibb Unrestricted Research Award and Grant Holder
1995	: Canadian Psychological Association Award for Distinguished Contribution to Canadian Psychology as a Profession
1995	: Fellow, Royal Society of Canada
1995	: Co-author of paper winning the Best Paper of the International Meeting on Pediatric Pain, Atlanta 
1997	: Co-author of paper winning the Best Paper of the meeting at the American Association 	for the Study of Headache, New York 	
1998-2003: Distinguished Scientist Award, Medical Research Council of Canada (now Canadian Institutes of Health Research
1999	: Research Award, IWK Health Centre
1999	: Fellow, Canadian Psychological Association, Clinical Division 
1999	: Interview included in the John C. Liebskind History of Pain Collection UCLA
2000	: Zubeck Lecturer, University of Manitoba
2001 	: Wilbert E. Fordyce Clinical Investigator Award, American Pain Society
2001	: Canadian Pain Society, Distinguished Career Award
2001-2005: Killam Professor, Dalhousie University
2001	: Supervisor of and co-author with CIHR, Brain Star, Lynn Breau
2002	: Cecil and Ida Green Visiting Professor, University of British Columbia
2002-09: Canada Research Chair:  Pediatric Pain
2003	: Order of Canada (Officer)
2004	: Martin P. Levin Mentorship Award of the Society of Pediatric Psychology, American Psychological Association
2004	: Inaugural Patrick Wall Lecturer, New Zealand Pain Society, 
2004   : Distinguished Service Award, Faculty of Graduate Studies, Dalhousie University
2005   : Fellow, Canadian Academy of Health Sciences
2006	: Donald O. Hebb Award for Distinguished Contributions to Psychology as a Science, Canadian Psychological Association
2007	: A top producer of Scholarly Publications see: Stewart, PK, Wu, YP & Roberts, MC, Top Producers of Scholarly Publications in Clinical Psychology PhD Programs. J Clin Psychol 63: 1209–1215, 2007.
2009	: Jeffrey Lawson Award for Advocacy in Children's Pain Relief. American Pain Society
2009	: Invited Master Researcher/Clinician, American Psychological Association Convention, August 
2009-16: Canada Research Chair in Child Health (renewal)
2010	: Mayday Outstanding Contributor's Award, International Association for the Study of Pain, Special Interest Group on Pain in Children. 
2010	: Logan Wright Distinguished Research Award, Division 54 (Society of Pediatric Psychology) American Psychological Association  
2013   : Manning Principal Award for best innovation in Canada for Strongest Families 9with Patricia Lingley Pottie)
2013   : Initial winner of the Pat Award for Mentorship of the International Forum for Pediatric Pain 
2016   : Legacy of Leadership Award, HealthCareCAN
2017   : Governor General's Award for Innovation for Strongest Families (with Patricia Lingley-Pottie)
2017   : Difference Makers Award of the Centre for Mental Health and Addiction

Books
	McGrath, P.J. & Firestone, P. (Eds.). (1983). Pediatric and adolescent behavioral medicine: Issues in treatment. New York: Springer.
	Firestone, P., McGrath, P. & Feldman, W. (Eds.). (1983). Advances in behavioral medicine for children and adolescents. Hillsdale, New Jersey: Lawrence Erlbaum Associates.
	Feldman, W., Rosser, W. & McGrath, P. (1987). Primary medical care of children and adolescents. Oxford University Press.
	McGrath, P. & Unruh, A. (1987). Pain in children and adolescents. Amsterdam: Elsevier. Published in hardcover and softcover editions.
	Anand, K.J.S. & McGrath, P.J. (Eds.). (1993). Pain in Neonates. Amsterdam:  Elsevier. Also available in paperback.
	Finley, G.A. & McGrath, P.J. (Eds.) (1998). Measurement of pain in infants and children. Seattle: IASP Press.
	WHO working group (P.J. McGrath and 21 others). (1998). Cancer Pain Relief and Palliative Care in Children.  Geneva, WHO.
	McGrath, P.J. & Finley, G.A. (Eds.) (1999) Chronic and recurrent pain in children and adolescents.  Seattle: IASP Press
	Anand, K.J.S., Stevens, B. & McGrath, P.J. (Eds.) (2000).  Pain in Neonates, 2nd edition, Amsterdam, Elsevier
	Finley, G.A. & McGrath, P.J. (Eds.) (2001) Acute and procedure pain in infants and children.  Seattle, IASP Press.
	McGrath, P.J. & Finley, G.A. (eds.) (2003) Pediatric Pain:  Biological and Social Context. Seattle, IASP Press
	Finley GA, McGrath PJ, Chambers CT (eds.).(2006).  Bringing Pain Relief to Children. Totowa, NJ: Humana Press.
	Anand, KJS, Stevens B, and McGrath PJ (eds.) (2007) Pain in Neonates and Infants (3rd ed). Elsevier, New York
       McGrath, PJ, Stevens,BJ, Walker, SM and William T. Zempsky, WT, (eds) Oxford Textbook of Paediatric Pain, Oxford

He has published hundreds of peer reviewed articles and his Google Scholar h index is 94 (94 articles cited at least 94 times) with over 36,000 citations.

References

External links
 Centre for Pediatric Pain Research
 Order of Canada citation

1948 births
Living people
Officers of the Order of Canada
Fellows of the Royal Society of Canada
Canadian psychologists